This is the list of the 17 members of the European Parliament for Bulgaria in the 2019 to 2024 session. The members were elected in the 2019 European Parliament election in Bulgaria.

List 

Source:

References 

Bulgaria
List
2019